The Bergamo – San Vigilio funicular is an funicular railway connecting Bergamo's Upper City to the top of San Vigilio hill.

The funicular opened on August 27, 1912 and was temporarily closed between 1976 and 1991.  The line begins near the Sant'Alessandro Gate at the western edge of the Upper City from where it climbs  in elevation at approximately 22% grade to San Vigilio hill.  Original plans to urbanize San Vigilio were never realized and there is presently a belvedere and accommodation at the upper terminus.

Initially the funicular consisted of two cars but this was reduced to a single car with a capacity of 55 persons in 1991.  Travel time for the route is 2 minutes and 40 seconds.  The funicular's ticket cost is €1.30 and is integrated into the  transit network.

References

Transport in Bergamo
Railway lines in Lombardy
Funicular railways in Italy